Mobile Backstage is a software application (app) developed by Steam Republic which provides a fan club service accessible on the web, Facebook and mobile devices.

The Mobile Backstage platform enables fans to interact and share experiences with each other and the artist. It contains a content management system that enables artists and production companies to post up-to-date information about a band's activities, including text, images, video clips, etc., while integrating content from and to Twitter, Facebook and iTunes.  The app provides the band with analytics on fan activities and events.

Background 
In January 2007, two Finnish companies, Mobile Backstage and Geniem, combined to win the FinNode Web-2-Mobile competition with their idea of connecting artists to their fans with a mobile app.
A company called Steam Republic, founded by Paavo Bäckman and Jussi Ruusila, was officially registered in November 2009 in Tampere, Finland and they began developing the app. In early 2012, Steam Republic closed a bridge funding round of $1.3 million (€1 million). Wired Magazine UK listed Steam Republic among "Europe’s 100 Hottest Startups of 2012."

Features 
The Mobile Backstage app was originally developed for iOS. A Facebook version was announced in June 2011, followed closely by an Android version in November 2011 and a native web version in January 2012. Nokia's MeeGo and QT platforms were also supported until June 2012, when Evanescence announced their Mobile Backstage, but more recent artists to do so, such as Anthrax, no longer seem to offer this option.

Artists with Mobile Backstages 
Some of the artists with their own Mobile Backstage in August 2012 include Evanescence, Anthrax, Mumford & Sons, Slightly Stoopid, Nightwish, Jessie J, Tinie Tempah, Amorphis, The Kooks, Black Label Society, Lykke Li, Rusko, Rebelution, Ensiferum and Johnny Reid.

References 

Customer relationship management software